Chit Lom station is a BTS skytrain station, on the Sukhumvit Line in Pathum Wan District, Bangkok, Thailand. The station is located on Phloen Chit Road at Chit Lom intersection to Lang Suan and Chit Lom Road. It is also linked by Skybridge directly to Central Chidlom department store, and Sky Walk to Ratchaprasong intersection where Central World, Gaysorn Plaza and Erawan Shrine is situated next to Pratunam clothing market within walking distance from the intersection. The Sky Walk also links the station with Siam station, with cluster of luxury shops in Siam Square and Siam Paragon shopping mall.

See also
 Bangkok Skytrain

BTS Skytrain stations